Blatce is a municipality and village in Česká Lípa District in the Liberec Region of the Czech Republic. It has about 100 inhabitants.

Administrative parts
Villages of Beškov, Blatečky, Houska, Konrádov and Tubož are administrative parts of Blatce.

Sights
Blatce is known for the Houska Castle. It is open to the public.

References

Villages in Česká Lípa District